Georges Bou-Jaoudé, CM (27 December 1943 – 28 March 2022) was a Maronite Catholic hierarch, who served as archbishop of the Maronite Catholic Archeparchy of Tripoli in Lebanon.

Life
Georges Bou-Jaoudé was born in 1943 in Jouret El-Ballout, Lebanon, and on 25 December 1966 made his religious vows as a friar of the CM and was ordained priest on 9 February 1968. The Synod of Maronite Bishops elected him on 24 September 2005 Archeparch of Tripoli in Lebanon. This choice was confirmed by the Holy See on 28 December 2005. Maronite Patriarch of Antioch, Cardinal Nasrallah Boutros Sfeir, ordained him bishop and his co-consecrators were Bishop Roland Aboujaoudé, auxiliary bishop of Antioch and Tanios El Khoury, Emeritus Eparch of Sidon, on 11 February 2006.
As Archeparch of Tripoli of Libano he was, in October 2010, a delegate at the Special Assembly of the Synod of the Middle East. As co-consecrator he assisted in the episcopal ordination of Joseph Soueif, Archeparch of Cyprus and Hanna Alwan, MLM, Titular bishop of Sarepta dei Maroniti and Curia Bishop of Antioch.

References

External links

 http://www.kirche-in-not.de/aktuelle-meldungen/weltweite-hilfsprojekte/2009/08-18-hg-2009-09-libanon-bau-pfarrsaal-rmeilet-ardeh
 http://www.catholic-hierarchy.org/bishop/bbouj.html
 http://www.gcatholic.org/dioceses/diocese/trip1.htm

1943 births
2022 deaths
Lebanese Maronites
21st-century Maronite Catholic bishops
Lebanese Roman Catholic archbishops
Vincentian bishops
People from Matn District